William Egerton (1684–1732) was a British Army officer and Whig politician who sat in the House of Commons almost continuously from 1706 to 1732.

Early life
Egerton was the fourth son of John Egerton, 3rd Earl of Bridgwater and his wife Jane Paulet, daughter of Charles Paulet, 1st Duke of Bolton. He travelled abroad in Germany and then joined the army.

Career
Egerton was returned unopposed as Member of Parliament (MP) for Buckinghamshire at a by-election on 27 February 1706. At the 1708 British general election, he  was returned unopposed as Whig MP  for Brackley. He was initially inactive in the House as he was serving with the army in Flanders, but voted for the impeachment of Dr Sacheverell in 1710.  He was returned again at the 1710 British general election and voted for the motion of ‘No Peace Without Spain’ and   against the French commerce bill on 18 June 1713. At the 1713 British general election he was   returned in  a contest and on voted against the expulsion of Richard Steele on 18 March 1714. Egerton was said to have spoken insultingly about the Duke of Ormond, and in April 1714 he was told  by Secretary at War, Francis Gwyn,  that the Queen ‘had no further service for him’ and was to be given 1,000 guineas for his company. He was then unseated on petition on 20 April 1714.

After the Hanoverian succession Egerton was made Colonel of his own infantry regiment, later known as the 36th Regiment of Foot. He was returned unopposed as MP for Brackley at the 1715 general election. In 1719 he was made Colonel of another Regiment, later known as the 20th Regiment of Foot. He was returned unopposed again for Brackley in 1722 and 1727. He voted with the government on all known occasions.

Death and legacy
Egerton died on 15 July 1732. He had married Anna Maria Saunders, the daughter of Admiral Sir George Saunders, Commissioner of the Navy, and had three daughters. His daughter Jane married Thomas Revell MP of Fetcham Park.

References

|-

1684 births
1732 deaths
Royal Warwickshire Fusiliers officers
Members of the Parliament of Great Britain for English constituencies
English MPs 1705–1707
British MPs 1707–1708
British MPs 1708–1710
British MPs 1710–1713
British MPs 1713–1715
British MPs 1715–1722
British MPs 1722–1727
British MPs 1727–1734
Grenadier Guards officers
Younger sons of earls